This page is a list of film adaptations of video games. These include local, national, international, direct-to-video and TV releases, and (in certain cases) online releases. They include their scores on Rotten Tomatoes, the region in which they were released (for foreign adaptations), approximate budget, their approximate box office revenue (for theatrical releases), distributor of the film, and the publisher of the original game at the time the film was made (this means that publishers may change between two adaptations of the same game or game series, such as Mortal Kombat). Also included are short films, cutscene films (made up of cutscenes and cinematics from the actual games), documentaries with video games as their subjects and films in which video games play a large part (such as Tron or WarGames).

Many films based on video games have often received generally mixed-to-negative reviews, often for their screenplays, casting choices, and lack of originality or loyalty to the source material. From 2019 to 2022, only four video game films had a "fresh" (60% or above) rating on Rotten Tomatoes: The Angry Birds Movie 2 (2019), Detective Pikachu (2019), Sonic the Hedgehog (2020), and Sonic the Hedgehog 2 (2022). However, Werewolves Within (2021) became the best-reviewed film based on a video game.

In the video game film adaptation box office, only five films had a tremendous box office gross with more than $400 million worldwide as of July 2022; Warcraft (2016), Rampage (2018), Detective Pikachu (2019), Uncharted (2022), and Sonic the Hedgehog 2 (2022).

Theatrical releases

English-language

Live-action

Animated

Japanese

Live-action

Animated

Mandarin/Cantonese

Live-action

Animated

Television films

Direct-to-video

Live-action

Animation

Short films
Listed below are original short films produced, commissioned or licensed from a game publisher.

Documentaries on video games

Theatrical releases

Television

Other releases
{| class="wikitable sortable" style="width:100%;"
|-
! Title !! Release date !! Subject
|-
| Game Over: Gender, Race & Violence in Video Games || 2000 ||
|-
| In the Game || 2007 || The game industry, technology, and the future of gaming
|-
| Once Upon Atari || 2007 ||
|-
| FPS - Por dentro do virtual (Portuguese) || 2009 || Ethnographic research of an FPS gamers community
|-
| Get Lamp || 2010 || Documentary by historian Jason Scott about interactive fiction (text adventures) and Infocom
|-
| Level Up - A story about gamers and the games they play || 2011 || Exploration of video gaming culture
|-
| Minecraft: The Story of Mojang || 2012 || Documentary about the history of the company Mojang and its creation, Minecraft.
|-
| Free to Play || 2014 || Documentary by video game developer Valve about the lives of three players competing in a gaming tournament for Dota 2
|-
| Good Game  || 2014 || Nine men pursue careers in competitive video games as members of the Evil Geniuses' StarCraft II division
|-
| Video Games: The Movie || 2014 || Documentary by Jeremy Snead
|-
| Atari: Game Over || 2014 || Documentary on the excavation of Atari video games.
|-
| Gaming in Color || 2014 || Documentary on the LGBTQ community in video games.
|-
| GameLoading - Rise of the Indies || 2015 || Follows several independent game developers.
|-
|Good Game: The Beginning
|2018
|Feature film about an underdog Esports team that competes in a League of Legends tournament
|-
| Insert Coin || 2020 || History of Midway Games 
|-
|Tetris || 2023 || Biotopic movie about battle for the "Tetris" rights
|}

Films with plots centered on video games
 Tron (1982) – Kevin Flynn, an arcade game designer, gets sucked into the video game world he created and has to fight his way back to the real world.
 Nightmares (1983) – The segment "Bishop of Battle" stars Emilio Estevez as a video game wizard who breaks into the arcade at night to get to the 13th level, in doing so he becomes part of the game.
 WarGames (1983) – Computer hacker breaks into military intelligence computer to play games, which almost starts a thermonuclear war.
 Joysticks (1983) – When a top local businessman and his two bumbling nephews try to shut down the town's only video arcade, arcade employees and patrons fight back.
 Cloak & Dagger (1984) – A young boy has secret plans given to him in the form of a video game cartridge, which he must protect from spies.
 The Last Starfighter (1984) – A boy, who is very good at a video game in his trailer park, finds himself recruited to be a pilot for an alien defense force just like the game he plays.
 The Dungeonmaster (1985) – A computer whiz is drawn into a series of realistic simulations by a demonic wizard who considers him a worthy adversary. Armed with his wrist-mounted X-CaliBR8 computer, he must solve the puzzles and rescue his girlfriend.
 Hollywood Zap (1986) – Tucker Downs tires of his boring job selling bras to fat ladies in Mississippi and heads for Hollywood to look for his long lost father. En route, Downs hooks up with wasted video game addict/hustler Ben Frank who is seeking a title match with "The Zap," holder of the record score in Zaxxon.
 Kung Fu Master (1988) – A love story between a 40-year-old woman (Jane Birkin) and a 15-year-old boy addicted to the arcade game Kung-Fu Master. Directed by Agnès Varda.
 The Wizard (1989) – A boy with mental problems decides to run away to compete in a video game contest and his brother helps him hitchhike to the tournament. Features numerous NES video games, primarily Super Mario Bros. 3 before its American release.
 The Lawnmower Man (1992) – A mentally handicapped man is turned into a genius through the application of computer science and virtual reality.
 Arcade (1993) – A teenager has to battle inside of a deadly virtual reality video game, in order to save her friends.
 Brainscan (1994) – A teenager is sent a mysterious computer game that uses hypnosis to make the game the most horrifying experience imaginable. He stops playing, only to find evidence that the murders depicted in the game actually happened.
 Nirvana (1997) – A computer game designer, finds that his latest video game has a virus which has given consciousness to the main character of the game, Solo.
 eXistenZ (1999) – plot centered around a virtual reality game.
 How to Make a Monster (2001) – An evil video game comes to life and hunts the group of developers.
 Avalon (2001) – Science fiction film centered on a war-themed, virtual reality MMO under the same title. Directed by Mamoru Oshii.
 Game Over (2003) – Uses footage from five different Digital Pictures games.
 Spy Kids 3-D: Game Over (2003) – Carmen Cortez is caught in a virtual reality game designed by their new nemesis, the Toymaker. Juni, her little brother, goes into the game to save her as well as beta players and the world.
 GameBox 1.0 (2004) – A video game tester must fight to escape from a video game that has become all too real.
 Devour (2005) – A college student is under the demonic influence of an online game.
 Hellraiser: Hellworld (2005) - Features a MMORPG based on the Hellraiser mythology.
 Grandma's Boy (2006) – A 35-year-old game tester develops a game in secret only to have someone at work try to steal it.
 Stay Alive (2006) – Friends start dying just like they did in a video game they all played.
 Ben X (2007) – The main character Ben is an autistic boy obsessed with an MMORPG called ArchLord.  He plays the game to escape being bullied and has one online friend named Scarlite.  He considers suicide until he meets Scarlite in person.
 Press Start (2007) – Average suburban youth Zack Nimbus is recruited by an ill-tempered ninja and a tough-as-nails space soldier to save the world from a tyrannical, but comically insecure, sorcerer. References to many classic video games.
 WarGames: The Dead Code (2008) – is a sequel to the 1983 thriller film WarGames.
 Gamer (2009) – A man has to save humanity from being enslaved by an MMO.
 Assault Girls (2009) – Three girls in an MMO team up to win a boss battle. Directed by Mamoru Oshii.
 Scott Pilgrim vs. the World (2010) – Action comedy film rife with video game references and plot conceit similar to fighting games.
 Tron: Legacy (2010) – Kevin Flynn's son Sam finds his missing father in a new version of the virtual game world and has a similar journey as his father did fighting to get back to reality.
 Black Heaven (2010) – An innocent young man becomes enamored with a mysterious girl. He is lured into "Black Hole" – a dark, obscure video game world of avatars with deadly serious intentions in the real world.
 RPG: Metanoia (2010)
 Ra.One (2011) – Indian Bollywood superhero film, where a video game developer creates an unstoppable villain for his son which becomes all too real.
 .hack//The Movie (2012) – Japanese anime film based on .hack, a franchise of anime, video games, novels and manga that debuted in 2002, about a virtual reality MMORPG.
 Wreck-It Ralph (2012) – An arcade game villain who dreams of being a hero decides to leave his game in order to become one. Features cameos by multiple licensed video game characters like Sonic the Hedgehog, Pac-Man & Ryu.
 Angry Video Game Nerd: The Movie (2014) – Based on the web series of the same name.
 Pixels (2015) – When aliens misinterpret video-feeds of Arcade video games and console games as a declaration of war, they attack the Earth, using the games as models for their various assaults to fight aliens such as Donkey Kong and Mega Man.
 Sword Art Online The Movie: Ordinal Scale (2017) – Japanese anime film based on Sword Art Online, a novel, manga and anime franchise that debuted in 2002, about a virtual reality MMO, with Ordinal Scale being about an augmented reality MMO.
 Jumanji: Welcome to the Jungle (2017) –  Teenagers find a vintage video game version of Jumanji and get sucked into its jungle setting.
 Ready Player One (2018) – Based on the 2011 novel of the same name, it is set in a dystopian future and is about the search for an easter egg in a virtual reality game.
 Ralph Breaks the Internet (2018) – Sequel to Wreck-It Ralph, and part of the Wreck-It Ralph franchise.
 Serenity (2019) – Midway through the film, it is revealed that the story is occurring inside a virtual world.
 The King's Avatar: For the Glory (2019) – animated film based on the Chinese web novel of the same name.
 Jumanji: The Next Level (2019) – Sequel to Jumanji: Welcome to the Jungle.
 Boss Level (2021) – A retired soldier is trapped in a never-ending time loop that repeatedly results in his death. It adapts video game tropes in film format.
 Free Guy (2021) – Guy, a non-player character, becomes aware of his world being a video game called Free City.
 8-Bit Christmas (2021) – A father recounts his quest to get a Nintendo Entertainment System in the 1980s.
 Choose or Die (2022) – As people play the text-based video game CURS>R, the game begins to interact with the real world.

See also
 List of animated series based on video games
 List of anime based on video games
 List of highest-grossing films based on video games
 List of television series based on video games
 List of video games based on films
 Machinima

ReferencesNotesFootnotes'''

External links
 Video game adaptation comparison at Box Office Mojo
 Top 10 Worst Video Game Movies on Time''
 18 Video Game Films Currently In Production (2015) on GameSpot

Video games
Films